Living in the Moment may refer to:

Living in the Moment (Across Five Aprils EP), 2004
Living in the Moment, an EP by Mason Jennings, 2002
"Living in the Moment", a song by Jason Mraz from Love Is a Four Letter Word
"Living in the Moment", a song by Jorma Kaukonen from Stars in My Crown
"Living in the Moment", a song by Katharine McPhee
"Living in the Moment", a song by Ross Lynch from the television series Austin & Ally

See also
Living in a Moment, a 1996 album by Ty Herndon
"Living in a Moment" (song), the title song
Live in the Moment (disambiguation)
Live for the Moment (disambiguation)